CRAT or Crat may refer to :
 CRAT (gene), a human gene
 Bureaucrat
 Charitable Remainder Annuity Trust